RoboSapien is a toy-like biomorphic robot designed by Mark Tilden and produced by WowWee toys. The Robosapien X was made to entertain and will react to sounds and touch. The Robosapien is preprogrammed with moves, and also can be controlled by an infrared remote control included with the toy, or by either a personal computer equipped with an infrared PDA.

The robot's remote control unit has a total of 21 different buttons. With the help of two shift buttons, a total of 67 different robot-executable commands are accessible.

Overview
The toy is capable of a walking motion without recourse to wheels within its feet. It can grasp objects with either of its hands, and throw grasped objects. It has a small loudspeaker unit, which can broadcast several different vocalizations.

Released in 2004, the product sold over 1.5 million units between April and December 2004.

User modifications
Mark Tilden designed the Robosapien to be easily modified or hacked.  The electronics inside the toy are easily accessed and clearly labeled.  A growing community of hackers have devoted themselves to adding new functionality to the robot.  Some hacks have added a live video camera, others an LED belt that displays text, headlights, a coilgun, speech synthesis, a "flamethrower" (a small torch) and more. A modified RoboSapien is also used in the 2009 revival of The Electric Company.

Other uses
The first Robocup took place in 1997.

Germany Openen 2005 tournament two teams of three Robosapiens each played the first Soccer match of humanoid robots worldwide. University of Osnabrück played against a team from Albert Ludwig's University of Freiburg. Replacing the head by a PDA allowed the robot to perceive its environment with a camera, a control program could then react to this via the PDA's infrared sender.

Variants
In January 2007, two new Robosapien variants were introduced at the Toy Fair in London,
styled after Spider-Man and Homer Simpson, respectively. The Spidersapien features Spider-Man styled armor, and an array of Spider-Man sound effects. It was launched together with Spider-Man 3. Homersapien was launched to coincide with the release of The Simpsons Movie. He is similarly adapted with sound bites and a sculpted Homer head, as well as a unique Simpsons accessory and packaging. 
Robosapien also comes in chrome red, blue, silver with blue eyes, gold, green, pink, and also clear, other than the original white and black.

Many other Animals in the Robo series were created. These included "Robo-Pet" (A dog like creature) and "Robo-Raptor" (A Dinosaur like robot).
In early 2013, WowWee announced the "Robosapien X", a Robosapien that can be controlled via any iOS or Android (operating system) device.

also,in 2014 WowWee announced "Robosapien BLUE", a modified version of "Robosapien X",that can be played with phone app roboremote blue via bluetooth

Trivia
 The dance command plays an instrumental part from the song "You Spin Me Round (Like a Record)" by Dead or Alive.
 When you turn it off via remote, or it automatically turns off due to inactivity, it mimics the death scene from Citizen Kane (drops snow-globe, says Rosebud).
 Many unlicensed knockoff versions of Robosapien do exist, such as Robone, Kartman, Robowisdom, Roboactor, and other various versions made by a variety of different companies... As with almost all Unlicesned products however, these robots lack in quality and durability.

Specifications
 Length: 
 Height: 
 Width: 
 Weight:

Film

A CGI/live action film produced by Avi Arad named Robosapien: Rebooted was being produced in 2008 and was released in 2013.

See also
AIBO
Humanoid robot
Roboraptor
Roboreptile
Robosapien v2
Robopet
Roboboa
Roboquad
FemiSapien

References

External links

Robosapien Home on RoboCommunity - The official WowWee Robotics user community
The Evolution of Robosapien (in pictures)
 web site RoboDance for control robots Wow Wee

Toy brands
Toy robots
2000s toys
Bipedal humanoid robots
Entertainment robots
WowWee
2004 robots